Defensor San José is a Peruvian football club, playing in the city of Tumbes, Peru.

The club were founded 13 February 1965 and play in the Copa Perú which is the third division of the Peruvian league.

History
In the 2009 Copa Perú, the club classified to the National Stage, but was eliminated by Tecnológico in the semifinals.

In the 2010 Copa Perú, the club classified to the National Stage, but was eliminated by Unión Comercio in the round of 16.

Honours

Regional
Región I: 2
Winners (2): 2009, 2010

Liga Departamental de Tumbes:
Winners (1): 2009
Runner-up (1): 2010

Liga Provincial de Tumbes:
Winners (1): 2009

Liga Distrital de Tumbes:
Winners (1): 2009

See also
List of football clubs in Peru
Peruvian football league system

External links
 Los 16 expedientes

Football clubs in Peru
Association football clubs established in 1965